"Nancy (with the Laughing Face)" is a song composed in 1942 by Jimmy Van Heusen, with lyrics by Phil Silvers, called, originally, "Bessie (With The Laughing Face)". It was originally recorded by Frank Sinatra in 1944. Many, perhaps most, people—including, for a time, Sinatra himself—wrongly assume or assumed the song was composed specifically for Sinatra's wife or daughter, each named Nancy; the adjustment in name indeed was inspired by Sinatra's daughter.

Origin

Former broadcast executive and music historian Rick Busciglio tells the story of the song's inception as related to him by Van Heusen:

Notable recordings

Pharoah Sanders, William Henderson, Stafford James, Eccleston W. Wainwright  - Welcome to Love (1991)
Cannonball Adderley, Bill Evans, Percy Heath, Connie Kay - Know What I Mean? (1961)
 Karrin Allyson - Ballads: Remembering John Coltrane (2001)
Tony Bennett - Perfectly Frank (1992)
Corry Brokken - Voor Nancy (1971)
Ray Charles - Dedicated To You (1961)
John Coltrane - Ballads (1962)
Kurt Elling - Dedicated to You: Kurt Elling Sings the Music of Coltrane and Hartman (2009)
The Fleetwoods - Softly (1961)
The Four Freshmen - Voices in Standards (1996), Four Freshmen And Five Saxes/The Four Freshmen and Five Guitars (1998)
Grant Green - The Complete Quartets with Sonny Clark (1962)
 The Johnny Mann Singers - The Songs of Sinatra (1962)
Flip Phillips - Phillips Head (1975)
Frank Sinatra - Sinatra's Sinatra (1963)
Ben Webster - The Warm Moods (1961)
Mark Tremonti - Mark Tremonti sings Sinatra (2022)

In popular culture

 In the Sopranos episode, "Watching Too Much Television," Paulie Gualtieri returns from jail to a big welcome back party at the Bada Bing! club. Following a group toast, Silvio Dante cues up some music and "Nancy (with the Laughing Face)" begins to play. Paulie, lost in emotion for a few moments, finally smiles and says "my song." Bobby Bacala is seen asking Silvio "What the fuck? Why is this his song?"
 An episode of The Commish entitled "Nancy with the Laughing Face" features a guest character named Nancy who is played by Wendie Malick. It aired in October 1994 as part of the fourth season.
 In a 1973 episode of Doctor Who, The Green Death, a member of the environmental activists group the Wholeweal community is referred to by its leader Clifford Jones as "Nancy with the Laughing Face" to Jo Grant during her visit to the community's hub, the "Nuthutch".
 The song was a favorite of President Ronald Reagan, with Frank Sinatra singing a rendition entitled "Nancy (with the Reagan Face)" at his first inaugural ball in 1981.

References

External links
 from lecture "Confessions of An Ad Man," by Rick Busciglio telling the story of the creation of the song.

1944 songs
Songs with lyrics by Phil Silvers
Songs with music by Jimmy Van Heusen
Frank Sinatra songs
Ray Charles songs
The Fleetwoods songs
Tony Bennett songs
1940s jazz standards